The Social Democratic Party (Partido Social Democrata) is a centrist political party in East Timor.
In the parliamentary election held on 30 August 2001, the party won 8.2% of the popular vote and 6 out of 88 seats. President of PSD is Minister for Foreign Affairs Zacarias da Costa since 7 December 2008.

In the June 2007 parliamentary election, the PSD formed an alliance with the Timorese Social Democratic Association (ASDT), and together they won 15.73% of the vote and 11 seats.

The Party (PSD) was established by Mario Viegas Carrascalao, Zacarias Albano da Costa, and Leandro Isaac, amongst other prominent figures of the timorese political elite on 20 September 2000. The Social Democratic Party is currently led by Zacarias Albano da Costa, who is also Minister for Foreign Affairs since 8 August 2007.

References

Political parties in East Timor